Helen West is a British television crime drama series, based upon the novels of Frances Fyfield, a former crown prosecutor, whom the character is loosely based upon, that first broadcast on 15 December 1999 on ITV. The pilot episode, Trial By Fire, stars Juliet Stevenson as the title character, with Jim Carter co-starring as Chief Superintendent Geoffrey Bailey. The pilot was also released on VHS on 24 January 2000.

In 2001, following the success of the pilot, a series of three episodes was commissioned, titled The Helen West Casebook. The role of Helen West was subsequently re-cast with Amanda Burton taking over the role, and Conor Mullen replacing Jim Carter as Geoffrey Bailey. The series began broadcasting on ITV on 6 May 2002. Despite obtaining a cult following, the series was not renewed for a second run. The series was distributed internationally by Acorn Media, and was released on DVD in the United States on 18 August 2009. The series was later released on DVD in the United Kingdom on 24 May 2010.

Plot
The series features on the work of Crown Prosecutor Helen West (played by Juliet Stevenson in Trial By Fire and Amanda Burton in The Helen West Casebook), who tries to achieve balance in a life that consists of an emotionally heavy caseload and a stressful relationship with her supervising police officer, Geoffrey Bailey (played by Jim Carter in Trial By Fire and Conor Mullen in The Helen West Casebook).

West is a very hot-headed and driven woman who tends to pursue justice in each case, even when she is told by her bosses to drop them. As "Deep Sleep" is the third of the Fyfield novels in the series, viewers of The Helen West Casebook are plunged straight into the story without much introduction, with West undergoing and recovering from surgery, and finding solace in the arms of Superintendent Bailey.

Cast

Pilot (Trial By Fire)
 Juliet Stevenson as Helen West
 Jim Carter as Ch. Supt. Geoffrey Bailey
 Anton Lesser as Brian Redwood
 Emily Joyce as WDC Amanda Scott
 Ian Redford as Sgt. John Bowles

Series (The Helen West Casebook)
 Amanda Burton as Helen West
 Conor Mullen as Ch. Supt. Geoffrey Bailey
 Nicholas Woodeson as Brian Redwood
 Martin Freeman as DC Don Stone
 Jessica Oyelowo as Rose Darvey
 Anthony Howell as Dinsdale Cotton

Episodes

Pilot (1999)

Series (2002)

References

External links

1999 British television series debuts
2002 British television series endings
1990s British crime drama television series
2000s British crime drama television series
ITV television dramas
English-language television shows
Serial drama television series
Television series by ITV Studios